The Emblem of Madhya Pradesh is the official seal of the government of the Indian state of Madhya Pradesh.

Design
The emblem is a circular seal depicting the Lion Capital of Ashoka in front of a banyan tree. The Lion Capital and tree are supported by stalks of wheat and rice and the whole emblem is surrounded by 24 stupas figures.

Historical emblems

Princely states

Government banner
The Government of Madhya Pradesh can be represented by a banner displaying the emblem of the state on a white field.

See also
 National Emblem of India
 List of Indian state emblems

References

Government of Madhya Pradesh
Madhya Pradesh
Symbols of Madhya Pradesh